Missouri is currently divided into 8 congressional districts, each represented by a member of the United States House of Representatives.

Due to the 2010 census, Missouri lost a congressional seat in 2013.  The biggest impact has been in the 3rd congressional district (which includes portions of St. Louis which had large population losses in the census).  The district effectively became part of the 1st district.  The largely rural 9th district, which also suffered population decreases and was also dissolved, became part of the 6th district north of the Missouri River and part of a redrawn more rural 3rd district south of the river.

After the 2020 census, the number of congressional districts stayed the same.

Current districts and representatives
List of members of the United States House delegation from Missouri, their terms, their district boundaries, and the district political ratings according to the CPVI. The delegation in the 118th United States Congress has a total of 8 members, including 6 Republicans and 2 Democrats.

Historical and present district boundaries
Table of United States congressional district boundary maps in the State of Missouri, presented chronologically. All redistricting events that took place in Missouri between 1973 and 2013 are shown.

Obsolete districts
The following list includes districts which are no longer in use in Missouri, due to Missouri's decrease in population relative to the United States at large in recent times.

 , obsolete since the 2010 census
 , obsolete since the 1980 census
 , obsolete since the 1960 census
 , obsolete since the 1950 census
 , obsolete since the 1950 census
 , obsolete since the 1930 census
 , obsolete since the 1930 census
 , obsolete since the 1930 census
 , obsolete since 3 January 1935
 , obsolete since statehood in 1821

See also

List of United States congressional districts
Historical maps from The Columbia Missourian

References